This is a list of fictional characters in the television series The 4400. The list includes the series main characters, recurring characters, minor characters, as well a list of the 4400 returnees.

Main characters

Tom Baldwin
Tom Baldwin, portrayed by Joel Gretsch, is the series's main protagonist. Tom was formerly at the FBI, and a longtime friend of Dennis Ryland. He joined Ryland at NTAC, but left after 5 months to investigate the circumstances surrounding his son, Kyle Baldwin, being comatose. He employed private investigators to find his missing nephew Shawn Farrell, in an attempt to discover the truth. Kyle's comatose state places great strain on Tom's marriage to Kyle's mother, Linda, and at some point before the Pilot the two have separated.

Kyle Baldwin
Kyle Baldwin, portrayed by Chad Faust, is Tom and Linda's son and Shawn Farrell's cousin. He is possessed by a human being from the future, who reveals he was supposed to act as a communication channel between the future and Tom, to guide him in his dealings with the returned 4400 as they attempt to avoid the catastrophe that has caused humans to largely die out. He is responsible for the murder of Jordan Collier and spends several months in prison. He takes promicin to gain healing abilities but instead developed an imaginary guide that assumed the appearance of a woman named Cassie Dunleavy. At the end of the series he convinces his father to also take a promicin shot.

Jordan Collier
Jordan Collier, portrayed by Billy Campbell, is one of the central figures of the 4400. Intelligent and persuasive, he quickly recognized the 4400 and their situation as being on a war footing with the government. Although his motives and means change during the course of the series from greed to altruism, Jordan's greatest wish appears to be that he will be remembered as a hero who changed the world, in the eye of the future. Jordan Collier's ability to neutralize promicin is discovered in "The Wrath of Graham" when he strips Graham Holt of his ability. It is theorized that this ability only works on promicin-positive non-4400s. Jordan Collier and Danny Farrell have the exact opposite ability.

Collier was initially described to Campbell as an "interesting" character rather than as a villainous role, a characterization that Campbell believes that the writers stuck with.  Eric Goldman of IGN described Collier as "a fascinatingly morally ambiguous figure; one who seems like a Jesus figure one moment and nearly genocidal in another".  Campbell himself has described the character as "a sociopath" and "ever manipulative".

Shawn Farrell
Shawn Farrell, portrayed by Patrick Flueger, was born December 12, 1983, and disappeared April 22, 2001 from Highland Beach near Seattle, Washington, while with his cousin Kyle Baldwin. Shawn was not intended to be a 4400; as Kyle and Shawn are drinking at the beach, Shawn witnesses Kyle in the act of being abducted, and in an effort to help him, interrupts the process and is taken instead. Shawn has the ability to control the flow of life in living organisms, usually manifesting itself through healing physical damage done to the bodies of others. Limits for this power are unclear; although he is capable of basic healing, having successfully healed broken bones, severe burns and even a mortal stab through the chest, but is later able to heal people with cancer and all sorts of diseases. His ability is by close proximity - he tends to touch his targets, but can heal through clothing. When threatened he can reverse his power and drain the life-force from others, effectively killing them. He uses this latter ability to drive a possessing entity out of Kyle, and in a vision of the future he witnessed – in which, the catastrophe itself ripped the United States apart – he kills Richard Tyler, in apparent retaliation for Richard's pre-emptive strike (against whom has not yet been explicitly revealed). He is also forced to use this ability on his brother Danny as a mercy killing.

Nina Jarvis
Nina Jarvis, portrayed by Samantha Ferris, became the director of NTAC in season two after succeeding Dennis Ryland; Ryland took his role back temporarily while Nina recovered from a gunshot wound. Nina returned as the director of NTAC after recovering from her injuries. Nina was later dismissed and replaced by Meghan Doyle.

Alana Mareva
Alana Mareva, portrayed by Karina Lombard, was born October 17, 1969, in Tahiti, and disappeared September 5, 2001, from Seattle, Washington. Prior to her abduction, her husband and only son Billy had been killed by a drunk driver. She was an artist who owned an art gallery and travelled the world to purchase pieces for display there. Alana can telepathically create a completely realistic subjective alternate reality that she and a person with whom she is in physical contact can perceive. The reality can incorporate ideas from Alana or from her subject and is normally indistinguishable from objective reality. A great deal of time can pass in such realities while very little objective time passes. There is evidence that subjective realities of long duration accumulate subtle errors that permit the subconscious of the subject to recognize them for what they are. Tom Baldwin eventually realized that he was in subjective reality because of such errors. Alana was at that time subjected to the effects of the promicin-inhibitor. Most 4400s developed their abilities or refined their control when no longer dosed with the inhibitor. In season three, Diana Skouris was able to remain in the alternate reality without Alana. It was revealed by that incident that a participant in the alternate reality must be consciously willing to leave it.

Dennis Ryland
Dennis Ryland, portrayed by Peter Coyote, was the original supervisor and director of NTAC (National Threat Assessment Command) during season one. Ryland was close friends with agent Tom Baldwin for many years. The two worked together at the FBI, and Ryland arranged for Tom to transfer with him to NTAC; this would damage their relationship, as Tom left after only 5 months to investigate the circumstances surrounding his son Kyle's comatose state. Ryland reinstates Tom into NTAC in the Pilot episode, recognizing that Tom is still one of his best agents, and partners him with Diana Skouris. During season one, Ryland is constantly portrayed as sympathetic to the 4400 and darkly amused when he informs Skouris and Baldwin that it's their job to resolve the mystery of the 4400's new-found abilities. However, as soon as Orson Bailey demonstrated his power of telekinesis, Ryland secretly ordered a separate investigation into the cause of the paranormal abilities, and possible methods of curtailing them. When a 4400 began to compel others to commit murder, Ryland ordered that the incomplete promicin inhibitor be used, in order to safeguard the country. During the final episode of season two, Ryland is arrested for his involvement for the production and administration of the Promicin inhibitor to unsuspecting returnees. He is put on trial because of the inhibitor scandal and T.J. Kim of the Nova Group causes Ryland's lawyer to attack him. The attempt fails and a hospitalized Ryland is later attacked by the telepath Gary Navarro. In season three he begins working as the leader of a privately owned company, Haspel Corporation, a defense contractor aiding the NSA in the tracking of the Nova Group, a terrorist organization of 4400 returnees. His prime motivation is based on his belief that the existence of civilians with 4400 abilities is a danger to the country, and works to limit the use of supernatural abilities created by promicin to the military and the government.

Diana Skouris
Diana Skouris, portrayed by Jacqueline McKenzie, was partnered with Tom Baldwin in the pilot episode to investigate the 4400 returnees. The first, eight-year-old Maia Rutledge, asks to move in with her in the season one episode "The New and Improved Carl Morrissey". Diana adopts her in Season Two. At the beginning of season 4, Diana is seen in a vision/dream of Jordan Collier with the power to freeze time, although later in the show, it's revealed that she is immune to the effect of promicin.

Maia Skouris
Maia Skouris, portrayed by Conchita Campbell, was born February 28, 1938, and disappeared March 3, 1946, at age 8 from Crescent City, California. She is the earliest of the returnees to be taken and the first to exhibit a special ability. Maia began recording her visions in diaries. She was adopted by Diana Skouris in Season 2. Maia is able to see future events (precognition). Generally, this ability is difficult for Maia to control and visions appear to her without warning. With concentration, however, she is able to predict specific events, first seen when her Aunt April helps her win at gambling. In the season three episode "Gone (Part 1)" she admits that she has gained greater control of her ability since she is no longer taking the promicin inhibitor.

Lily Tyler
Lily Tyler, portrayed by Laura Allen (young) and Tippi Hedren (aged), was born August 4, 1966, and disappeared May 26, 1993, from Orlando, Florida. Her parents divorced when she was at the age of 14. At the time of abduction, she was married to Brian Moore, and is the mother to Heidi Moore. While she was in the future, Richard's DNA was extracted and put into her. She has the power of empathy and uses it to read Isabelle's feelings. Another possible power of hers would be age transmission, i.e. to transfer day, or years from other people's lives to herself and vice versa. Since the instant change of age between Isabelle and Lily happened exactly after Lily was freed from the effect of the promicin-inhibitor, it's to be said that Isabelle, unintentionally, used her mother's power against her. An image of Lily is created in One of Us, to convince Richard to restore Isabelle, now a baby, back to her adult form. She is created by a fellow 4400 on behalf of Kyle Baldwin. This Lily has no memory of events after she passed out whilst looking for Isabelle in the season two finale. After convincing Richard that his actions were wrong, she begins to fade, and Richard realizes what he had suspected all along; that she was not "really" Lily, Lily having died a year before. She finally fades away, telling Richard she loves him, as he holds her. The real Lily also appears in flashback form in "One of Us"; the "marked" Tom Baldwin remembers operating on her and Richard in the future after their initial abduction, impregnating Lily with Richard's child. Executive producer Ira Steven Behr originally pitched season three with the continuation of the character, but was told by the network to write her out of the show for "business reasons". Laura Allen, the actress who played Lily, subsequently accepted a role on another show. The season three opening episode presents Lily as an aged woman, portrayed by Tippi Hedren.

Richard Tyler
Richard Tyler, portrayed by Mahershala Ali, was one of the first 4400s to be shown, Richard is Lily Tyler's husband, and is the father of her second daughter, Isabelle Tyler. Born in 1922 in St. Louis, Missouri, and disappeared on May 11, 1951, Richard joined the U.S. Air Force and piloted their fighter jets in the Korean War. When his fellow officers and "friends" discovered he was having an affair with a white woman, Lily Bonham, they beat him. When they left Richard alone, he was abducted. This happened on May 11, 1951. While he was in the future, Richard's DNA was extracted and put into another abducted person, Lily Moore, Lily Bonham's granddaughter. The promicin-inhibitor entirely suppressed Richard's ability, leading him to believe he was one of many returned without an ability. After the inhibitor scandal and the cessation of inhibitor injections Richard developed telekinesis. His control of the ability was initially poor. Fearing his daughter, he worked with Heather Tobey to refine his control and can now more precisely control what he affects and where he moves it. When Richard reappears in Daddy's Little Girl, his powers have become far more powerful and refined. He demonstrates a much greater precision over small objects. He is able to summon a tomato to his hand from a great distance, stop a tranquilizer dart, and even render someone unconscious by pinching off the blood flow to the person's brain. He is able to effortlessly throw multiple full-grown adults through the air or pin them against walls- even if not in the immediate vicinity- as well as fling concrete barriers weighing hundred or possibly thousands of pounds with pinpoint accuracy.

Isabelle Tyler
Isabelle Tyler, portrayed by Megalyn Echikunwoke (adult, seasons 3–4), Christie Laing (adult, season 2), Jordan Lasorsa-Simon (toddler), and Madison Pettis (child), is the daughter of Richard Tyler and Lily Moore, Isabelle is technically not a 4400, she was born after the 4400 were returned, after the first season of the show. Isabelle possesses several paranormal abilities, though they were temporarily removed by an injection sent by the people from the future: the ability to create illusions, limited precognition, control over others' powers, tissue regeneration, improved learning abilities, telekinesis, telepathy and psychopyresis. She was not affected by Shawn Farrell's ability to drain someone's life-force. She had worked with Haspel Corporation and was the source of the promicin they used in attempts to induce 4400 mutations in people who were never abducted. She left after HaspelCorp's team was destroyed by Boyd Gelder's suicide bomb. Afterwards, she moved to attack the 4400 Center but ended up losing her abilities when her father used his telekinesis to inject her with a serum given to Tom Baldwin by the people from the future. She was shot by Baldwin, but survived, and was held in custody. In the fourth-season premiere, she was visited in prison by Baldwin, who was looking for information on his missing girlfriend, Alana, believing Isabelle would have the closest connection to the people from the future. During the episode Fear Itself, it is revealed by a prison official that Isabelle has contracted a promicin allergy and would die if she takes the promicin shot, made available by Jordan Collier to try to regain her abilities. During the episode "One of Us", it is revealed that the agent from the future who is possessing Tom Baldwin intends to restore Isabelle's powers via complete blood transfusion. In the episode "Tiny Machines", she is seen using her powers on Jordan Collier's bodyguards.
–

Meghan Doyle
Meghan Doyle, portrayed by Jenni Baird only appeared in Season Four as the new head of NTAC. Doyle graduated summa cum laude from Yale University with a joint degree in economics and sociology. She studied at Cambridge University as a Marshall Scholar before returning to the states and earning a PhD in political science, specializing in conflict negotiation. She was recruited by a government think tank where she designed response protocols for natural disasters and terrorist attacks. Integral in the writing of a 2004 document outlining the government's response to the 4400's return, Doyle proved herself an expert in the field. She was nominated by Rebecca Parrish, Director of National Intelligence, to take over for Nina Jarvis at NTAC-Seattle. In the last episode it is shown that she has developed the ability of transmutation by accidentally turning her pen into a flower.

Recurring characters

Kevin Burkhoff
Played by Jeffrey Combs, Kevin first appeared in the season two premiere episode "Wake Up Call", in which he was a patient in a psychiatric hospital. Kevin suffered from paranoid personality disorder and had not spoken in six years, and was friends with a schizophrenic 4400 named Tess Doerner. Tess used her 4400 ability to get everyone in the hospital to build a machine she saw in her mind, mistakenly believing that it would contact the future. When the machine was built, it created a pulse that released everyone from Tess' mind control and cured Kevin of his mental illness. It was then revealed that Kevin was a world-renowned neuroscientist and likely the "father of the 4400 technology".

Kevin was the one who discovered how to cure the side effects of the promicin inhibitor during the season two finale.

In the third season, Kevin begins to inject himself with promicin in order to gain some type of 4400 ability. The shots he took disfigured his appearance by causing wounds on his chest and loss of his nails, though in exchange it granted him rapid (but inconsistent) healing of muscle tissue. This was first demonstrated when he put a scalpel through his hand and it healed within seconds. After several months of injections, his entire body was covered in lesions and decaying tissue, but his regenerative abilities were now fully active, as he literally resurrects himself after taking four nine millimeter rounds to the chest at the hands of one of Dennis Ryland's agents and being placed in a body bag for autopsy.

After a failed attempt by him and Tess to perform the same promicin-injection procedure on Diana Skouris, he shed his skin like a snake, revealing an untarnished appearance. Kevin now possesses the paranormal ability to regenerate.

Kevin and Tess Doerner ran away together in the season three episode "The Ballad of Kevin and Tess"; later, in the episode "Terrible Swift Sword", it is revealed that they went to work at a small town garage where Tess used her ability to bring customers to the local businesses. Kevin and Tess were recruited to help Jordan Collier steal Dennis Ryland's promicin, and they are currently in hiding with Collier.

During their time with Collier, without proper medication, Tess once again comes under the influence of her schizophrenia and leaves, causing Kevin to follow her. He is later seen in a small town where Tess forces most of the denizens to participate in her "sweet sixteen", but due to an intervention by Shawn Farrell, Tess is cured of her illness. Kevin is then enlisted by Shawn to create a promicin-profiency test that can tell if one is going to survive a promicin shot or not. Before he is finished, Kevin is then kidnapped by Kyle Baldwin, who believes the test will ruin the promicin distribution movement.

The serum Kevin Burkhoff injected himself with to gain an ability was not the same solution of pure promicin that was used to cure the 4400 of the inhibitor. Kevin makes it very clear in "The New World" that he is injecting himself "with a modified version of the promicin serum". The promicin given away to the public by Jordan Collier comes directly from Isabelle's veins, which is why the promicin shots have a 50-50 chance of either killing the recipient (with multiple brain aneurysms) or giving an ability.

Marco Pacella
Marco Pacella (Richard Kahan) is in charge of NTAC's theory room, and is the one who initially proposed that each 4400 has caused a "ripple effect". He often appears to somewhat resent his colleagues, at one point labeling them as the "Two most annoying people on the planet".

His relationship with the NTAC agents Tom Baldwin and Diana Skouris is strained at first; Tom had little patience for the Theory Room's methodology, and Diana claims that he intimidates Marco and his colleagues. When Tom prepares to rescue his son Kyle, Diana goes to Marco for help. At this point, Marco hints at his feelings toward Diana, claiming that he isn't helping for Tom's benefit; the look of shock on Diana's face implies that she had been completely unaware of his feelings.

Marco continues to aid the NTAC agents from the Theory Room. His friendship with Diana grows, with her teasing him affectionately. He makes a forgery of Diana's daughter Maia Skouris' vision diary, so that Diana will not have to hand the real one to the government for analysis. Maia had even predicted Marco's future death in her diary. Although surprised when he read about it, he thought that the manner of his foretold death was "actually pretty cool".

Marco and Diana finally begin a relationship during the season 2 finale, "Mommy's Bosses", as Marco says he will support Diana through the long process of bringing the promicin inhibitor conspirators to trial.

In the season 3 episode "Blink", Diana ends the relationship with Marco as she believes she is using him to avoid becoming close to a man more her type. Despite being hurt at the rejection, Marco is never shown to be anything other than supportive of her. Whilst dating Diana, Marco had become friendly with her daughter Maia, and Maia asks after him even after the breakup.

Marco informs Diana that April is missing and in possession of promicin, leading to Diana's reinstatement into NTAC and move back.

He later believes that making conspiracy movies is the ability of 4400 Curtis Peck. When Diana is searching for a safe place to hide Peck, Marco uses his apartment (leading to a momentary awkwardness as he and Diana remember their brief relationship) as a base for Peck to write his newest script, although Peck is later compromised by "The Marked".

It is Marco who deduces the location of Jordan Collier's base in Seattle, before Collier reveals his "Promise City" to the US government.

When Marco's colleague uses his own promicin-induced ability, putting many of the principal "players" into a game of survival, the failed relationship between Marco and Diana is re-examined. Maia does not understand why Marco no longer visits them, and Marco admits to Diana that he does find it a little hard seeing her every day. Diana asks if he would be willing to give genuine friendship a try, and offers him an invitation to dinner with her and Maia.

After being infected by a promicin-inducing virus in "The Great Leap Forward", Marco can seemingly teleport to any place he is thinking of, as he appears in Promise City after looking at a photograph of the location.

Tess Doerner
Tess Doerner (Summer Glau) disappeared April 3, 1955.

Tess is first seen in the second season premiere episode "Wake Up Call". She is a paranoid schizophrenic living in a psychiatric hospital. She has mentally taken control of the patients and staff at the hospital to undertake a task of building an unknown structure. Once completed, an attempt at powering up this unknown device seems to fail, until Tess's friend and protector Kevin Burkhoff speaks for the first time in six years; he has been "woken up" by the device and is revealed to be the probable "father" of 4400 technology.

Tess is later seen in the episode "The Ballad of Kevin and Tess", when Tom Baldwin and Diana Skouris are looking for Kevin. Tess claims not to have seen him; however, secretly she is keeping Kevin at her house, as he has mutated due to his promicin experiments. Tess has also been instructing Diana to come to her house using her abilities so that Kevin could inject her with promicin. After the events that follow, Kevin and Tess run off.

In the episode "Terrible Swift Sword", Jordan Collier receives help from 4400s with the ability to trace people to track Kevin and Tess and discovers where they are hiding; he then goes to visit them and enlists them in his plan to steal Dennis Ryland's stores of promicin.

She uses her ability to prevent Richard Tyler from destroying the entire supply of stolen promicin in the third season finale "Fifty–Fifty".

In the fourth season premiere, Tess suffers a relapse into schizophrenia and begins "seeing" dead people. In the episode "Daddy's Little Girl", Tess's schizophrenia is finally cured by Shawn Farrell.

April Skouris 
April (Natasha Gregson Wagner) is the artistic free-spirited sister of NTAC Agent Diana Skouris. When she was introduced she was the "black sheep of the family": unlucky, unmarried, steady job-less, and very untrustworthy. Maia, was briefly tricked into using her ability to choose lottery tickets and wager on sports for her "Aunt April". After this was discovered, Diana told April she was not allowed to see Maia and to come back one day when she is a better person.

Later in the series April returns with a handsome boyfriend named Ben and a successful job at her own tattoo shop. Although things seem up for her, things take a wrong turn. She proves to be unlucky in her relationship with Ben (Brennan Elliott), recently losing him to her sister, Diana.

April becomes depressed and coming to the realization that her life is pointless she takes a promicin shot, gaining the ability to make anyone truthfully answer any direct question she asks. She used this ability to make a living blackmailing people, and falls in love with a man named Colin. However, one of her "marks" is the vice president of a Fortune 500 company which paid for hitmen and was selling defective armor to the military. The "mark" has April's new boyfriend murdered.

Shocked, sad, and frightened at her loss and the new danger she is in, April returns to Diana for help and for a short time helps them uncover the killer using her ability. April uses her powers to expose the head of the corporation to NTAC, and is later employed by the federal government, using her powers in interrogations. She and Diana leave off on a more positive note than before.

Gary Navarro 
Prior to his abduction (January 5, 1973), Gary Navarro (Sharif Atkins) only worried about baseball and getting to the Major Leagues. After his return, Gary hoped to continue his life's goal. Although NTAC Agent Tom Baldwin had promised to help him gain control his recently emerged telepathic abilities, Gary was swept up and made a spy for NTAC, an NSA agent, and eventually a member of the 4400 radical terrorist organization, Nova Group.

Gary was first used by NTAC to spy on the newly opened 4400 Center, reading the minds of Jordan Collier to dig up information. After he was uncovered as a spy, he was taken by the NSA to be used to find 4400s from hostile nations. His job was to eliminate them before they could be used as weapons. Finding out he'd been used to kill his own kind pushed Gary to then join Nova.

While working for Nova, Gary was captured when he attempted to murder Dennis Ryland. Agents loyal to Ryland subjected Gary to torture, including waterboarding, at the NTAC facility. When Tom Baldwin objected to his cruel punishment, NSA arranged to remove Navarro to another remote facility. Navarro was gladly freed in transit by the Nova group but after T.J. Kim's murder, Gary became dissatisfied with the Nova Group's operations and tired of the war, so he quit.

After a larger controversy where he escaped re-capture by NTAC thanks to Alana Mareva, Tom finally fulfilled his promise to Gary and helped him flee from the United States. Gary is currently a fugitive, reportedly in Canada.

Nikki Hudson 
Nikki (Brooke Nevin) is the Farrells' neighbor and was Danny's girlfriend, until Shawn returned. Nikki and Shawn developed feelings for each other and dated until Shawn ran away to the 4400 Center. She returns later asking for Shawn's help curing her cancer-stricken father. They seem on the verge of renewing their relationship but Shawn calls it off, fearing that Isabelle will try to kill Nikki as an obstacle to her and Shawn's happiness.

Danny Farrell 
Danny (Kaj-Erik Eriksen) is Shawn's younger brother who, because Shawn "stole" his girlfriend, is a staunch anti-4400 college student. Danny goes to the same college as Kyle. During season two, however, Matthew Ross suggested to Shawn that he should mend things with his family to help his image. Since then, Danny has healed his relationship with his older brother, though tensions still exist between the two.

The antagonistic relationship between the brothers flares up again in season four. Danny has felt that becoming a lawyer, in view of the powers possessed by promicin-positive individuals, has become pointless. In spite of his brother's advice, Danny wants to take promicin, and he mocks Shawn's warnings as fear that Shawn will no longer be the "special one". After realizing that taking promicin is Danny's own choice, Shawn gives a shot to him, but asks Danny to wait a few weeks to think it over.

In Tiny Machines, Danny, having heard about the test being developed by Kevin Burkhoff to determine whether or not an individual can tolerate promicin, approaches his brother at the 4400 Center. Though the test had not yet been completed, Burkhoff was able to predict, due to Danny's prominent Corpus callosum, that he would indeed survive if he took the shot. After doing so, Danny was unharmed - however during a visit home, in which he reveals that he is now "P-Positive" to his mother over drinks, the latter begins to exhibit signs of an aneurysm similar to those induced when individuals who can't tolerate promicin take the shot.

After many deaths, Danny realizes that his body is creating more promicin than it can contain and is involuntarily releasing it, infecting many. Much like the shots, the victims have a 50% chance of either surviving or acquiring a special ability. He eventually seeks Shawn's help and is put on the promicin inhibitor, but is left with an ultimatum: die from the buildup of promicin or get off the inhibitor and risk infecting others. Not wanting to kill anyone else, Danny forces Shawn to euthanize him. Meanwhile, the ensuing chaos of people being infected by promicin is used by Jordan Collier to bolster the support of his movement and take control of Seattle. Danny Farrell and Jordan Collier have the exact opposite ability.

Matthew Ross 

Matthew (Garret Dillahunt) was a lobbyist in the Collier organization who advises Shawn after Jordan Collier's death. Matthew ran the day-to-day business of the 4400 Center and it is hinted Collier gave him specific instructions of what to do.

Early episodes in the third season suggested that Matthew knew more about the 4400 and Jordan Collier's assassination than he had revealed. When Isabelle Tyler was contemplating suicide, Ross told her she was nearly invulnerable, but offered her a syringe that he claimed would kill her. In a later episode, a similar toxin was given to Tom Baldwin from the future in order to neutralize Isabelle.

Matthew is later murdered by Isabelle when she inflicted an instantaneous stroke upon him. He had manipulated her for some time, and informed her that her purpose was to destroy the 4400. He implied that his loyalty lay with a faction from the future, one that opposed the 4400 project. This faction would be described to Tom Baldwin by the future people, and were described as cold and brutal in their methods.

In the fourth-season episode "The Marked", it is revealed through Curtis Peck's ability that Ross was among a ten-strong group of prominent individuals in society who have had their consciousness "hijacked" by the 4400-opposed faction. A side-effect of this operation leaves a mole underneath the subject's left earlobe, along with a vaguely X-shaped mark (hence the title of Curtis' Independent film and thus the episode). This mole is never actually visible in any scenes where Matthew was present, but it is explicitly revealed that he was the first known "Marked".

Heather Tobey
A school teacher, Heather (Kathryn Gordon) disappeared March 2, 1974. Her ability is to allow people to realize their full potential with regard to any special talent they may have. She unlocked artistic potential in several of her students. After several parents complained about their children being "altered", she quit. In the third season, she works at the 4400 Center's school. While taking the promicin inhibitor, her ability only worked on children, but without the inhibitor she can help adult 4400s focus their abilities, e.g., she helped Richard Tyler gain greater control over his telekinetic abilities.

She now works as an assistant to Shawn Farrell at the 4400 Center.

Cassie Dunleavy 
Cassie Dunleavy (Tristin Leffler) is seemingly the physical manifestation of Kyle Baldwin's ability. She makes her first appearance in the fourth-season premiere, "The Wrath of Graham".

Cassie first approaches Kyle in a park where she poses as an art student. During the course of their conversation she suggests Kyle inject his cousin, Shawn Farrell, with promicin to snap him out of his coma. Kyle takes her advice and Shawn is awakened.

Kyle later returns to the park to tell Cassie what happened, but she is not there. He tries to track her down at the art school she mentioned, but no one has ever heard of her.

When he next sees Cassie (in "Fear Itself"), he confronts her with this information. She does not tell him who she really is but instead encourages him to enter a house whose owner maintains a makeshift museum devoted to the 1918 cult, the White Lights. Among the artifacts Kyle encounters there is a book that describes the coming of a messiah whose portrait physically resembles Jordan Collier. There is also mention of a healer and a shaman, whom Cassie later reveals as Shawn and Kyle, respectively. She also reveals in this episode that she is Kyle's ability, and only he can see her.

In "Audrey Parker's Come and Gone", Cassie instructs Kyle to steal the book describing the White Lights prophecies that he had read in the previous episode. Kyle does as she asks, leaving a $100 donation for the curator as compensation.

Cassie later appears while Kyle is reading the book to tell him to meet her at the intersection of Forbes and Shady at 2 a.m., "where it's all beginning". She warns him that if he doesn't show, he'll never see her again. Kyle does show up at the appointed time, and is there to witness a car crash that leads to the liberation of Isabelle Tyler, in transit to her new holding facility.

Later, in the episode entitled "Tiny Machines", Kyle finally begins to lose faith in the wisdom of Cassie's advice. When Isabelle, under the influence of the now-Marked Tom Baldwin, turns her back on the movement and kidnaps Jordan Collier, Kyle angrily accuses Cassie of deceiving and manipulating him. Her response indicates that Isabelle's betrayal was all part of a larger plan, and that in Jordan's absence it will fall on Kyle to assume leadership of Promise City. In the follow-up book, Promises Broken by David Mack, Kyle finally realizes that Cassie is not always looking out for his interests and was leading him in dark directions by sometimes speaking through him and even using him as her puppet. She is described as being "more than a little crazy, and she's got a mean streak".

The Marked
The Marked are a group of people belonging to the anti-4400 faction in the future, and they are first revealed in their eponymous episode. They consist of ten "elites" sent from the future, whose goal is to preserve the timeline as it originally proceeded and to stop the 4400 - in particular, Jordan Collier. The Marked have taken over the minds and bodies of prominent people in the present day, manipulating the world in total secrecy. Due to the procedure involved in the implantation, the Marked cannot develop powers by taking promicin. They are revealed to have an X-shaped mark behind the left earlobe, as described in 4400 Curtis Peck's trailer for his film The Marked, which would have unveiled the entire conspiracy.

The only explicitly revealed agents thus far are Drew Imroth, the CEO of the Ubient Software Corporation; Rebecca Parish, the director of National Intelligence; and Matthew Ross. It was Ross who primed The Marked's ultimate weapon Isabelle Tyler to destroy the 4400, although the plan faltered when she murdered him.

When Tom Baldwin is sectioned in a mental hospital for reporting Curtis Peck's claims of conspiracy, The Marked implant a sleeper agent inside him. Drew Imroth later reassures his comrades that when they need him, Baldwin will be there for them. After seeing numerous memories belonging to another person, Tom Baldwin is eventually overcome by the being formerly possessing Matthew Ross. Baldwin then uses his NTAC status to his advantage, capturing Isabelle Tyler and blackmailing her into taking back her abilities.

Following an attack on Ubient Software Corporation by a promicin-positive, the rest of The Marked have Drew Imroth kill his host so that he can be implanted into another host, Jordan Collier. Baldwin then forces Isabelle to kidnap Collier.

When Tom Baldwin is later freed from The Marked's control, he tries to rescue Collier, but is captured. However, Isabelle soon turns against The Marked, killing Rebecca Parish and freeing Baldwin and Collier at the cost of her own life. Baldwin, still retaining his memories of being one of The Marked, then gives Collier a list of the remaining seven.

Known members of The Marked include:
Matthew Ross (deceased, agent transferred)
NTAC agent Tom Baldwin (alive, agent deceased)
Ubient CEO Drew Imroth (deceased, agent transferred)
Jordan Collier (agent status unknown)
National Intelligence agent Rebecca Parish (deceased, agent status unknown)

Minor characters

Introduced in season 1

Introduced in season 2

Introduced in season 3

Introduced in season 4

List of The 4400

References

Characters
Lists of fictional characters